Gowrie railway station is located on the Upfield line in Victoria, Australia. It serves the northern Melbourne suburb of Fawkner, and it opened on 17 May 1965.

History

1928-1956
Rail Motor Stopping Place No. 21 opened on 16 October 1928 at the site of the present Gowrie station, following the reinstatement of a passenger service on the Fawkner – Somerton line in March of that year. On 5 May 1956, it was closed when the passenger service ceased.

1965-present
On 17 May 1965, Gowrie station opened in its current form, on what was by then the Upfield line. The name of the station comes from a former grazing property named "Gowrie Park", which was named by the owner, who was originally from Gowrie, England. The Fawkner Crematorium and Memorial Park is located on part of the former property.

Just after 4:45am on 2 August 1977, a seven-car Harris train set rolled away from the station after the driver and guard were changing ends after taking the train out of a siding, as it was scheduled to operate a city bound service from Upfield. The train passed through fifteen level crossings and destroyed seven sets of hand gates before stopping just after Brunswick, between the Albert and Dawson Streets level crossings.

In 1998, Gowrie was upgraded to a Premium Station. Also in that year, the track from Fawkner to Gowrie was duplicated. Immediately north of the station, the double track merges into a single track, which continues to the terminus at Upfield. Prior to 1998, Platform 1 was a dock platform, requiring trains to cross further down the line near Merlynston.

Under the 2013 PTV Network Development Plan, the line between Gowrie and Upfield would be duplicated, and the line to Roxburgh Park reinstated. It would include a flyover over the North East standard gauge line, to allow Seymour V/Line services to run via Upfield, and eventual electrification of the line to Wallan.

Platforms and services

Gowrie has one island platform with two faces. It is serviced by Metro Trains' Upfield line services.

Platform 1:
  all stations services to Flinders Street

Platform 2:
  all stations services to Upfield

Transport links

Broadmeadows Bus Service operates two routes via Gowrie station, under contract to Public Transport Victoria:
 : Campbellfield Plaza Shopping Centre – Coburg
 : Upfield station – North Coburg

Dysons operates one route to and from Gowrie station, under contract to Public Transport Victoria:
 : to Glenroy station

Ventura Bus Lines operates one route to and from Gowrie station, under contract to Public Transport Victoria:
 : to Northland Shopping Centre

References

External links
 Melway map at street-directory.com.au

Premium Melbourne railway stations
Railway stations in Melbourne
Railway stations in Australia opened in 1928
Railway stations in the City of Merri-bek